Johann Christoph Handke (18 February 1694 in Rýmařov – 31 December 1774 in Olomouc) was a baroque painter from Moravia. He was the brother-in-law of the painter Joseph Ignatz Sadler. He made frescos as well as oil paintings.

Works

External links

1694 births
1774 deaths
Czech painters
Czech male painters
Baroque painters
People from Rýmařov
Moravian-German people